Senator Armstrong may refer to:

Members of the Northern Irish Senate
Henry Armstrong (politician) (1844–1943), Northern Irish Senator from 1921 to 1937
Robert Armstrong (Northern Ireland politician) (1888/1889–1961), Northern Irish Senator from 1956 to 1961

Members of the United States Senate
David H. Armstrong (1812–1893), U.S. Senator from Missouri
John Armstrong Jr. (1758–1843), U.S. Senator from New York
William L. Armstrong (1937–2016), U.S. Senator from Colorado

United States state senate members
George C. Armstrong (1872–1950), Illinois State Senate
Gibson E. Armstrong (born 1943), Pennsylvania State Senate
Harry Armstrong (politician) (1915–2011), Ohio State Senate
James Armstrong (Texas politician) (1811–1879), Texas State Senate
Kelly Armstrong (born 1976), North Dakota State Senate
Samuel Turell Armstrong (1784–1850), Massachusetts State Senate
Thomas H. Armstrong (1829–1891), Minnesota State Senate
Thomas Armstrong (New York politician) (1785–1867), New York State Senate
William W. Armstrong (politician) (1864–1944), New York State Senate

Fictional characters
Steven Armstrong, character in the video game series Metal Gear